Peter Espevoll is a Norwegian vocalist who, in 1993, started the band Extol, with whom he is most associated.

Background
Espevoll was the son of a missionary family, and spent a great deal of time in Kenya, Africa in his life. While in Kenya, he and his brother Christer Espevoll grew an affinity for heavier music, with Peter citing Jerusalem as his first interaction with the genre. Later, bands such as Barren Cross, Stryper, Vengeance Rising, Deliverance, Tourniquet, and Living Sacrifice would hold an influence in his life.

Espevoll began his musical career after his brother Christer Espevoll and cousin David Husvik started Extol in 1993. The band went through several lineup changes with Husvik and Espevoll being the only two constants. Christer later left the band along with longtime guitarist Ole Børud, who would later come back. The band disbanded in 2007, due to personal issues. During his time with Extol, he, his cousin, Tor Magne Glidje, John Robert Mjlånd, and Ole Halvard Sveen, all of the bands Extol, Lengsel, and Mantric, formed a side-project called Ganglion. Ganglion released two EPs, one as a seven-inch. The project became inactive, as did Extol. Espevoll stated that the band ended due to personal issues, for Espevoll, it was to spend time with his family.

Extol reformed in 2012 with the lineup of Espevoll, Husvik, and Børud. Espevoll stated the main reason to reunite the band was "to make the best music possible". During the band's hiatus, Espevoll spent some time in a Mental Facility, due to dealing with stress and anxiety. The band released their fifth self-titled album in 2013. Espevoll's brother and Extol founder Christer Espevoll was supposed to record on the album, but was unable to perform on the album. In 2014, the band went on hiatus after performing some live shows with Ole Vistnes (Shining, Tristana) and Marcus B. (Inevitable End, Miseration). During Extol's hiatus, Espevoll quit the band due to other commitments, leaving Husvik and Borud as sole members.

In late 2020, Espevoll created a new project alongside filmmaker and musician Åsmund Janøy, called Hrada. The name is derived from an old Norwegian word that means “to create”. On April 30, 2021, Hrada signed with Mythic Panda Productions as their first signing. On June 17, 2021, the band released their debut single “Gospel Oak”.

Personal life
Espevoll is married and has two children.

Discography
Extol
Studio albums
 1998: Burial
 2000: Undeceived
 2003: Synergy
 2005: The Blueprint Dives
 2013: Extol

EPs
 1999: Mesmerized
 2001: Paralysis

Compilations
 1996: Northern Lights / Norwegian Metal Compilation (Rowe Productions 012)

Videos
 2015: Of Light and Shade

Ganglion
 2002: Ganglion (7")
 2003: Stripped

References

External links

Official site

1979 births
Living people
Musicians from Bærum
Norwegian heavy metal singers
Christian metal musicians
21st-century Norwegian singers
Extol members